Veloo Annamalay was a Ceylonese politician. He was an appointed member of the Parliament of Sri Lanka. He a member of the was the Ceylon Workers' Congress, he served as its treasurer. His daughter Anushiya Sivarajah served as a Minister of the Central Provincial Council and general secretary of the Ceylon Workers' Congress.

References

Members of the 4th Parliament of Ceylon
Members of the 6th Parliament of Ceylon
Ceylon Workers' Congress politicians

Date of death missing
Year of death missing